The squaretails are a genus, Tetragonurus, of perciform fishes, the only genus in the family  Tetragonuridae.

They are found in tropical and subtropical oceans, and feed on jellyfish and ctenophores.

Species
The three species are:
 Bigeye squaretail, T. atlanticus Lowe, 1839
 Smalleye squaretail, T. cuvieri Risso, 1810
 Pacific squaretail, T. pacificus Abe, 1953

Timeline

References